The 2007–08 Macedonian First League was the 16th season of the Macedonian First Football League, the highest football league of Macedonia. The first matches of the season were played on 5 August 2007. Pobeda were the defending champions, having won their second title. The 2007-08 champions were Rabotnichki who won their third title.

Promotion and relegation 

1 Bashkimi was withdraw from the First League due to financial reasons.

Participating teams

League table

Results 
Every team will play three times against each other team for a total of 33 matches. The first 22 matchdays will consist of a regular double round-robin schedule. The league standings at this point will then be used to determine the games for the last 11 matchdays.

Matches 1–22

Matches 23–33

Relegation playoff

Top goalscorers

Source: Macedonian Football

See also
2007–08 Macedonian Football Cup
2007–08 Macedonian Second Football League

References

External links 
Macedonia - List of final tables (RSSSF)
Football Federation of Macedonia

Macedonia
1
Macedonian First Football League seasons